Verticordia elizabethiae, named as Elizabeth's featherflower, is a flowering plant in the myrtle family, Myrtaceae. An endemic species of Southwest Australia, it occurs near salt lakes as an erect bushy shrub.

Taxonomy
A species of Verticordia, the featherflowers, assigned to a section of the genus Verticordia sect. Verticordella. The type was collected in 2018 at a location reported imprecisely as Baladjie. Previously collected specimens, including one made by Charles Gardner in 1926 and another recognised as Verticordia sp. Koolyanobbing, were assigned by the authors, Barbara Rye and Matthew Barrett, to the new species.

The specific epithet honours the extensive contribution of Elizabeth Anne (Berndt) George, née Sykes (1935-2012) to the collection and research of verticordias. A treatment of the population had previously been published by George as an inland variant of Verticordia halophila.

Description
A low growing salt tolerant shrub between 0.4 and 1.2 metres in width and 0.3 to 0.6 m high. The species lacks evidence of a lignotuber.

Distribution and habitat
Only known at a restricted distribution range within the semi-arid Coolgardie bioregion, in an area near Southern Cross, Western Australia. It occurs on flats around salt lakes amongst other halophytes forming heath communities, species of Maireana, Gunniopsis and Frankenia, associated with Callitris.

References

elizabethiae
Halophytes
Endemic flora of Western Australia
Rosids of Western Australia
Plants described in 2020